Perelazy is a rural locality (a selo) in Krasnogorsky District, Bryansk Oblast, Russia. The population was 878 as of 2010. There are 26 streets.

Geography 
Perelazy is located 11 km northwest of Krasnaya_Gora (the district's administrative centre) by road. Seyatel is the nearest rural locality.

References 

Rural localities in Krasnogorsky District, Bryansk Oblast